O-Zone was a Moldovan Eurodance group that was active from 1999 to 2019. Originating in 1998 as a duo consisting of Dan Bălan and Petru Jelihovschi before the latter's departure, their official trio lineup in 1999 consisted of Dan Bălan, Radu Sîrbu, and Arsenie Todiraș.

The group gained global popularity with their song "Dragostea Din Tei" and their subsequent album DiscO-Zone.

The group re-united in 2017 for two concerts in Chișinău and Bucharest and in 2019 for one concert in Bucharest.

History

1998–2001: Formation and early years
O-Zone first formed as a duo of Dan Bălan and Petru Jelihovschi in 1998. They released their first album, Dar, Unde Ești..., in 1999. However, Jelihovschi had not intended to make music his career, so he split from Bălan. Undaunted, Bălan held open auditions for new band members. At one such audition, he met Arsenie "Arsenium" Todiraș, who eventually won over the initially skeptical Bălan with his version of Elvis Presley's "Love Me Tender". Bălan and Todiraș would have proceeded as a duo act until Bălan received a call from Radu Sîrbu, who wanted a chance to audition for the group. Despite Sîrbu having missed the initial auditions, Bălan agreed, and after a successful audition, Sîrbu joined O-Zone, officially making the group a trio.

2002–2004: Rise to success

In 2002, O-Zone moved from Moldova to Bucharest, Romania, hoping to gain more recognition. There, the group became an instant hit band with their upbeat song "Despre Tine" ("About You"), which held the top position on the Romanian Top 100 chart for three weeks in February 2003. Their second hit, which brought them worldwide attention, was "Dragostea Din Tei", translated roughly as "Love from the Linden Trees". It quickly became popular in Romania, where it also topped the Romanian singles chart for four weeks in September 2003, but faded from popularity by the end of 2003. However, the song gained popularity in Italy when the little-known duo Haiducii released a cover of "Dragostea Din Tei", which topped the Italian pop charts. Arsenie Todiraș later said that at the time that, while not illegal, Haiducii's cover felt like a betrayal because the group had not asked permission to make a cover. However, the cover's success led to curiosity about the original artist, and led to Time Records, an Italian record label, offering O-Zone a one-year contract. Soon after the song's release in Italy, it was also released in various other countries in Europe under Polydor Records and became an instant hit.

"Dragostea Din Tei" topped the singles charts of nearly a dozen European countries in 2004. It reached the top-10 in many other countries, including in the United Kingdom, where it reached number 3 on the singles chart. The re-release of "Despre Tine" in 2004 from the same album had similar success across Europe.

In contrast to their multi-platinum status in Europe, O-Zone never entered the Billboard Hot 100 singles chart in the United States, although it did reach the 14th position on the Hot Dance Airplay chart. The viral video "Numa Numa Dance" helped to boost awareness of "Dragostea Din Tei" in the U.S., but, while the song received moderate to major airplay, most Americans knew it simply as the "Numa Numa Song" and never knew the name of the original song or the group that performed it. "Dragostea din tei" was sampled in the song "Live Your Life" by T.I. and Rihanna, which topped the Billboard Hot 100 in late 2008.

2005: O-Zone split up
On 13 January 2005, while still very popular, the members of O-Zone announced their disbandment, citing personal reasons. Their last European concert was held at the 2005 Golden Stag Festival in Romania.

Also in 2005, Japanese music label Avex Trax gained distribution rights for O-Zone music in Japan and released the album DiscO-Zone in August 2005 in the country. The album, which features the song "Dragostea Din Tei", became immensely successful in Japan. Topping the Oricon albums charts, it reached over 800,000 sales in 2005 alone and became the 12th-most popular album of 2005, partially because the album was re-released twice by Avex Trax. DiscO-Zone ended up charting for over a year on the Oricon weekly albums chart and sold over one million copies overall.

2017: Return

On 5 May 2017, Dan Bălan, Radu Sîrbu and Arsenie Todiraş announced that O-Zone would be reforming for two concerts. O-Zone re-united for Europe Day on 9 May 2017. One of concerts was held in Chișinău and the other took place on the same day in Bucharest.

2019: New Year's Reunion

On 17 December 2019, Dan Bălan, Radu Sîrbu and Arsenie Todiraş announced that O-Zone would be performing for one concert, which took place on New Year's Eve 2019 in Bucharest as part of performances by stars of the 90s and 00s called Revelion 2020 Disco Night Fever. After the event, all three returned to their projects again. The exception was the collaboration of Radu and Arsenie for the song "Lay Down".

Discography

Albums

Singles

Other singles

References

External links
  O-Zone Official Japanese Website
  O-Zone Official German Website

 
Avex Trax artists
Dance music groups
Moldovan musical groups
Musical groups established in 1999
Musical groups disestablished in 2005
Romanian Eurodance groups
Romanian pop music groups
Romanian boy bands
1999 establishments in Moldova